The Journal of Multimedia was a monthly peer-reviewed scientific journal published by Academy Publisher. It covered the study of multimedia algorithms and applications, information retrieval, artificial intelligence, multimedia compression, statistical inference, network theory, and other related topics. The editor-in-chief was Jiebo Luo (University of Rochester).

Indexing and abstracting
The journal was abstracted and indexed in EBSCO databases, Scopus, EI Compendex, INSPEC, PASCAL, and ProQuest.

External links
 

Computer science journals
Monthly journals
English-language journals
Publications established in 2006